Chris Salem is a former Lebanon international rugby league footballer who represented Lebanon at the 2000 World Cup.

Background
Salem was born in Australia.

Playing career
Salem played 15 matches for Lebanon between 2000 and 2009, including at the 2000 World Cup and captaining the side at the 2009 European Cup.

In 2010, while playing for the Bankstown City Bulls in the Bundaberg Red Cup, Salem tested positive for methylhexaneamine and was immediately suspended. The NSWRL and Australian Sports Anti-Doping Authority later handed him a two-year suspension; he was suspended until 10 September 2012.

References

Living people
Australian rugby league players
Australian sportspeople in doping cases
Doping cases in Australian rugby league
Doping cases in rugby league
Lebanon national rugby league team captains
Lebanon national rugby league team players
Rugby league locks
Sydney Bulls players
Year of birth missing (living people)